Tympanistes  is a genus of moths of the family Nolidae. The genus was erected by Frederic Moore in 1867.

Species
 Tympanistes alternata Warren, 1912
 Tympanistes flavescens C. Swinhoe, 1905
 Tympanistes fusimargo Prout, 1925
 Tympanistes pallida Moore, 1867
 Tympanistes rubidorsalis Moore, 1888
 Tympanistes rufimacula Warren, 1916
 Tympanistes testacea Moore, 1867
 Tympanistes yuennana Draudt, 1950

References

Chloephorinae
Moth genera